L.A. Theatre Works (LATW) is a not-for-profit American media arts organization based in Los Angeles founded in 1984. The intent of the organization is to produce, preserve, and distribute classic and contemporary plays of significance. Along with its "live-in-performance" series (currently performed at the James Bridges Theatre on the UCLA campus), some productions are taken on national and international tours. Recordings of productions are posted on its website and available via broadcast syndication as a weekly series on radio stations.

Actors that have appeared in L.A. Theatre Works productions include John Lithgow, Annette Bening, Hilary Swank, Anne Heche, Ed Asner, Alfred Molina, Marsha Mason, Jason Ritter, David Strathairn, JoBeth Williams, Paul Giamatti, Neil Patrick Harris, Laurence Fishburne, Jimmy Smits, Héctor Elizondo, and Julie Harris among others.

History
The organization originally was known as "Artists in Prison", and used theatre to facilitate creative expression by incarcerated men and women. In 1980, it changed its name to "L.A. Theatre Works", and then in 1985, began producing and recording radio dramas. The founding members included Edward Asner, Richard Dreyfuss, Héctor Elizondo, Harry Hamlin, Julie Harris, Amy Irving, Stacy Keach, John Lithgow, Marsha Mason, JoBeth Williams, and current Producing Director Susan Loewenberg, who joined together out of a desire to create a venue for stage acting in Los Angeles.

Between 1985 and 2012, L.A. Theatre Works has recorded over 400 plays. Titles include works by Arthur Miller, Oscar Wilde, David Mamet, Yasmina Reza, Tom Stoppard, Jon Robin Baitz, Kenneth Lonergan, Rebecca Gilman, Lynn Nottage, William Shakespeare, Sophocles, Molière, and many others.

In 1997, L.A. Theatre Works received an NEA Media Arts grant of $100,000 to support a campaign to increase the nationwide audience for its theater library.

In 2005, it launched its National Touring program, taking "live-in-performance" radio dramas to venues across the country. As of 2012, L.A. Theatre Works has visited over 200 civic and performing arts centers and university venues with numerous productions.

In 2011, the organization began performing at the UCLA James Bridges Theatre, moving from the Los Angeles Skirball Cultural Center.

In 2011, it began collaborating with Roundabout Theatre Company to broadcast productions from National Theatre Live in HD. These screenings are held at the UCLA James Bridges Theatre. The first of these screenings was The Importance of Being Earnest produced by Roundabout Theatre Company, starring Brian Bedford.

In 2011, the organization completed its first International Tour of China with the play Top Secret: Battle for the Pentagon Papers.

In 2012, it began releasing e-books of its plays. These e-books allow a user to listen to a recorded play while reading along with the text.

As of May 2012, L.A. Theatre Works has a weekly public radio show in over 80 markets in the U.S., along with available online streaming at their website, which is hosted by Loewenberg and also contains bonus wrap-around content. The show is distributed by PRX.

L.A. Theatre Works' audio productions have received awards from the Corporation for Public Broadcasting, Writers Guild of America, Publishers Weekly, Library Journal, and Audio Publishers Association, among others. Recordings are available in over 9,000 libraries throughout the U.S. and to the general public through the official website and from select retailers.

Artist Advisory Council 
The Artist Advisory Council currently includes Rosalind Ayres, Ed Begley Jr., Héctor Elizondo, Martin Jarvis, Stacy Keach, Marsha Mason, Richard Masur, Alfred Molina, David Selby, Eric Stoltz, JoBeth Williams, and Charlayne Woodard.

References

External links
 LATW.org: Official L.A. Theatre Works (LATW) website
 LATW.org: Company Overview + History — based in Venice, California.
LATW.org: Radio Theatre Series — streaming shows + station affiliates.

Theatre companies in Los Angeles
American radio dramas
Arts organizations based in California
Mass media in Los Angeles
Non-profit organizations based in Los Angeles
Venice, Los Angeles
Entertainment companies based in California
Arts organizations established in 1974
1974 establishments in California